Blepharomastix fuscilunalis is a moth in the family Crambidae. It was described by George Hampson in 1907. It is found in Costa Rica, Guatemala and Panama.

The wingspan is about 20 mm. The forewings are white, the costal area suffused with fuscous brown and the apical area suffused with fuscous brown. The hindwings are white, with a slight dark discoidal lunule, with an oblique line from it to the tornus.

References

Moths described in 1907
Blepharomastix